Nicos Poulantzas (21 September 1936 – 3 October 1979) was a Greek-French Marxist political sociologist and philosopher. In the 1970s, Poulantzas was known, along with Louis Althusser, as a leading structural Marxist; while at first a Leninist, he eventually became a proponent of democratic socialism. He is best known for his theoretical work on the state, but he also offered Marxist contributions to the analysis of fascism, social class in the contemporary world, and the collapse of dictatorships in Southern Europe in the 1970s (such as Francisco Franco's rule in Spain, António de Oliveira Salazar's in Portugal, and Georgios Papadopoulos' in Greece).

Life
Poulantzas studied law in Greece and moved to France in 1961; there he completed a doctorate in the philosophy of law under the title The rebirth of natural Law in Germany (La renaissance du droit naturel en Allemagne) in 1964. He taught sociology at the University of Paris VIII from 1968 until his death. He was married to the French novelist  and had one daughter. He committed suicide in 1979 by jumping from the window of a friend's flat in Paris.

Theory of the state 

Poulantzas's theory of the state reacted to what he saw as simplistic understandings within Marxism. Instrumentalist Marxist accounts held that the state was simply an instrument in the hands of a particular class. Poulantzas disagreed with this because he saw the capitalist class as too focused on its individual short-term profit, rather than on maintaining the class's power as a whole, to simply exercise the whole of state power in its own interest. Poulantzas argued that the state, though relatively autonomous from the capitalist class, nonetheless functions to ensure the smooth operation of capitalist society, and therefore benefits the capitalist class. In particular, he focused on how an inherently divisive system such as capitalism could coexist with the social stability necessary for it to reproduce itself—looking in particular to nationalism as a means to overcome the class divisions within capitalism. Poulantzas has been particularly influential over the Marxist state theorist, Bob Jessop.
  
Borrowing from Antonio Gramsci's notion of cultural hegemony, Poulantzas argued that repressing movements of the oppressed is not the sole function of the state. Rather, state power must also obtain the consent of the oppressed. It does this through class alliances, where the dominant group makes an "alliance" with subordinate groups as a means to obtain the consent of the subordinate group. In his later works, Poulantzas analysed the role of what he termed the "new petty bourgeoisie" in both consolidating the ruling classes hegemony and undermining the proletariat's ability to organise itself. By occupying a contradictory class position—that is to say, by identifying with its de facto oppressor—this fraction of the working class throws its lot in with the bourgeois whose fate it (wrongly) believes it shares. The fragmentation (some would argue the demise) of the class system is, for Poulantzas, a defining characteristic of late capitalism, and any politically useful analysis must tackle this new constellation of interests and power. A highly abbreviated example of this can be seen in a Poulantzas-influenced analysis of the New Deal in the United States: the American ruling class, by acceding to some of the demands of labour (things like minimum wage, labour laws, etc.), helped cement an alliance between labour and a particular fraction of capital and the state (Levine 1988). This was necessary for the continued existence of capitalism, for if the ruling class had simply repressed the movements and avoided making any concessions, it could have led to a socialist revolution.

Legacy 

Poulantzas provides a nuanced analysis of class structure in an era when the internationalisation of production systems (today "globalisation") was shifting power from labour to capitalist classes. In many areas, he foresaw the current debate on the critical Marxian language of class, bourgeoisie, and hegemony finds little echo in contemporary political science, where its positivism requires researchers to focus on putative measurable and objective entities. However, by placing class analysis at the center of political analysis, Poulantzas reminds us that theorists are political agents themselves and that accounts of the political world are suffused with the ambient ideology that they suppose themselves to bracket.

The official think-tank of SYRIZA, a left-wing Greek political party, is called Nicos Poulantzas Institute.

Major works
 Poulantzas, Nicos. Fascism and Dictatorship: The Third International and the Problem of Fascism. NLB, 1974 (orig. 1970). 
 Poulantzas, Nicos. Classes in Contemporary Capitalism. NLB, 1975 (orig. 1973). 
 Poulantzas, Nicos. The Crisis of the Dictatorships: Portugal, Greece, Spain. Humanities Press, 1976. 
 Poulantzas, Nicos. Political Power and Social Classes. NLB, 1978 (orig. 1968). 
 Poulantzas, Nicos. State, Power, Socialism. NLB, 1978. 
 Poulantzas, Nicos. The Poulantzas Reader: Marxism, Law and the State, ed. J. Martin. Verso, 2008.

References

Further reading
 Aronowitz, Stanley and Peter Bratsis eds. Paradigm Lost: State Theory Reconsidered. University of Minnesota Press, 2002.
 Gallas, Alexander, Bretthauer, Lars, Kannankulam, John and Ingo Stützle eds. Reading Poulantzas. Merlin Press, 2011.
 Gallas, Alexander The Thatcherite Offensive: A Neo-Poulantzasian Analysis. Brill, 2015.
 Jessop, Bob. Nicos Poulantzas: Marxist theory and political strategy. Macmillan, 1985.
 Levine, Rhonda. Class struggle and the New Deal: industrial labor, industrial capital, and the state. University Press of Kansas, 1988.

External links
 Nicos Poulantzas Institute (in Greek and English)
 "A Trotskyist critique of Poulantzas's theory of the state" by Colin Barker, International Socialism
 Website on Poulantzas' work and to the book "Reading Poulantzas" (in German)

1936 births
1979 suicides
Marxist theorists
Greek anti-capitalists
Greek sociologists
Greek Marxists
20th-century Greek philosophers
Greek emigrants to France
Suicides by jumping in France
Analysands of Jacques Lacan
Writers from Athens
Political sociologists
Academic staff of Paris 8 University Vincennes-Saint-Denis
1979 deaths